Facia Boyenoh Harris is a women’s rights  activist against gender-based violence in Liberia in particular against pervasive sexual assault and harassment of school-aged girls. She is the co founder of Paramount Young Women Initiative. She is the Director for Outreach and Sensitization of Liberia’s Freedom of Information Act-enforcing Independent Information Commission. She was awarded the International Women of Courage Award in 2022.

References

Liberian women activists
Recipients of the International Women of Courage Award
Year of birth missing (living people)
Living people
Liberian women's rights activists